The Sony FE 28-60mm F4-5.6 is a full-frame variable maximum aperture standard zoom lens for the Sony E-mount, announced by Sony on September 14, 2020. It was introduced on the same day as the Sony α7C, for which it is available bundled as a kit lens. At 167g it is the smallest and lightest full-frame zoom lens available for the E-mount.

Though designed for Sony's full-frame E-mount cameras, the lens can be used on Sony's APS-C E-mount camera bodies, with an equivalent full-frame field-of-view of 42-90mm (1.5x crop factor).

Construction 
The lens has a plastic exterior with a plastic zoom ring and smaller electronic focus ring. It also has a mechanical retracting mechanism which must be extended before shooting. The length of the lens varies through the zoom range, but stays constant when focusing. The mount is sealed with a gasket for dust and weather resistance. The lens does not feature optical image stabilization, instead relying on the camera's in-body SteadyShot stabilization when available.

Optical properties 
Centre sharpness is high throughout the zoom range, with soft extreme corners that improve as the lens is stopped down to f/8. Vignetting performance is average, occurring most noticeably at the widest focal lengths and apertures. The lens exhibits moderate lateral and longitudinal chromatic aberration; the former is easily corrected either in-camera or in post-processing, with the latter persisting throughout the aperture range. Coma is noticeable but controlled. Strong barrel distortion is seen at 28mm which transitions to slight pincushion distortion at 60mm; however, this is also handled well by the in-camera corrections. The lens is near parfocal.

Autofocus 
The lens has an internal linear autofocus motor. It supports both manual focus and direct manual focus modes (DMF) electronically. Focusing is quick, accurate and almost silent, with good low-light performance.

See also
List of Sony E-mount lenses

References 

Sony E-mount lenses
Camera lenses introduced in 2020